Chae Jegong (12 May 1720 – 22 February 1799) was a noted scholar, writer, politician of the Joseon period of Korea. Chae was the leader of the Southerners during the reign of King Jeongjo.
He passed the regional civil examination (향시) at the age of 15, the mungwa exam at age 23 in 1743, and held high government offices throughout his life, the Yeonguijeong position (i.e. Chief State Councilor) among them. He came from the Pyeonggang Chae clan.

Family
Grandfather:
Chae Seong-yun (채성윤, 蔡成胤; 1659–1733)
Father:
Chae Eung-il (채응일, 蔡應一; 1686–1765)
Mother:
Lady, of the Yeonan Yi clan (부인 연안 이씨)
1st older sister: Lady Chae (부인 채씨)
Older Brother-in-law: Sim Ji-yeon (심지연, 沈祉衍)
2nd older sister: Lady Chae (부인 채씨)
Older Brother-in-law: Yi Tae-un (이태운, 李台運)
Wive(s) and children:
Lady Oh of the Dongbok Oh clan (부인 동복 오씨) – No issue.
Lady Kwon of the Andong Kwon clan (부인 안동 권씨)
Chae Hong-won (채홍원, 蔡弘遠; 1762–1832) – adopted son, his biological father was Chae Je-gong's relatives, Chae Min-gong (채민공, 蔡敏恭)
Daughter-in-law: Lady Yi (부인 이씨) – daughter of Yi Gyeom-hwan (이겸환, 李謙煥); No issue.
Daughter-in-law: Lady Yi (부인 이씨) – daughter of Yi-Sik (이식, 李식).
Chae Hong-geun (채홍근, 蔡弘謹) – 1st son (2nd son-in-name)
Daughter-in-law: Lady, of the Naju Jeong clan (부인 나주 정씨)
Chae Hong-sin (채홍신, 蔡弘愼) – 2nd son (3rd son-in-name)

Gallery

In popular culture
Portrayed by Park Woong in the 2007 CGV TV series Eight Days, Assassination Attempts against King Jeongjo.
 Portrayed by Han In-soo in the 2007-2008 MBC TV series Lee San, Wind of the Palace.
 Portrayed by Kim Ik-tae in the 2010 KBS2 TV series Sungkyunkwan Scandal

References

Sources
 
 
 

1720 births
1799 deaths
18th-century Korean writers
Joseon scholar-officials